Yury Nikolaevič Shvytkin (24 May 1965, Krasnoyarsk) is a Russian political figure, deputy of the 7th, and 8th State Dumas. 

From 1986 to 1992, Shvytkin served at the 76th Guards Air Assault Division. From 1992 to 2001, he served at the Ministry of Internal Affairs of Krasnoyarsk Krai. From 2001 to 2016, he was the deputy of the Legislative Assembly of Krasnoyarsk Krai. In 2015, Shvytkin became a member of the All-Russia People's Front. In 2016 and 2021, he was elected deputy for the 7th, and 8th State Dumas.

References

1958 births
Living people
United Russia politicians
21st-century Russian politicians
Eighth convocation members of the State Duma (Russian Federation)
Seventh convocation members of the State Duma (Russian Federation)